Conchocarpus is a plant genus in the family Rutaceae.

species 
 Conchocarpus acuminatus
 Conchocarpus adenantherus
 Conchocarpus bellus
 Conchocarpus cauliflorus
 Conchocarpus concinnus
 Conchocarpus cuneifolius
 Conchocarpus cyrtanthus
 Conchocarpus dasyanthus
 Conchocarpus diadematus
 Conchocarpus elegans
 Conchocarpus fanshawei
 Conchocarpus fissicalyx
 Conchocarpus fontanesianus
 Conchocarpus furcatus
 Conchocarpus gaudichaudianus
 Conchocarpus grandiflorus
 Conchocarpus grandis
 Conchocarpus guyanensis
 Conchocarpus heterophyllus
 Conchocarpus hirsutus
 Conchocarpus inopinatus
 Conchocarpus insignis
 Conchocarpus jirajaranus Kallunki & W. Meier
 Conchocarpus larensis
 Conchocarpus longifolius
 Conchocarpus longipes
 Conchocarpus macrocarpus
 Conchocarpus macrophyllus
 Conchocarpus marginatus
 Conchocarpus mastigophorus
 Conchocarpus modestus
 Conchocarpus nicaraguensis
 Conchocarpus obovatus
 Conchocarpus odoratissimus
 Conchocarpus oppositifolius
 Conchocarpus ovatus
 Conchocarpus paniculatus
 Conchocarpus pentandrus
 Conchocarpus punctatus
 Conchocarpus ramiflorus
 Conchocarpus santosii
 Conchocarpus silvestris
 Conchocarpus sordidus
 Conchocarpus toxicarius
 Conchocarpus transitionalis
 Conchocarpus ucayalinus

References

External links 
 
 Conchocarpus at The Plant List (retrieved 2 April 2016)

Zanthoxyloideae
Zanthoxyloideae genera